Arnis Rumbenieks (born 4 April 1988) is a Latvian track and field athlete competing in road walking. Rumbenieks has competed at 2010 European Championships. At the 2012 International Road Walking Festival in Alytus, Lithuania he finished second behind Marius Žiūkas at the 20 km walk.  He has competed in the 20 km men's walk at the 2012 Summer Olympics in London.  He competed at the 2016 Summer Olympics, in the 50 km walk. In 2018, he competed in the men's 50 kilometres walk at the 2018 European Athletics Championships held in Berlin, Germany. He did not finish his race.

References

External links 
 
 
 

1988 births
People from Valmiera
Latvian male racewalkers
Living people
Athletes (track and field) at the 2012 Summer Olympics
Athletes (track and field) at the 2016 Summer Olympics
Olympic athletes of Latvia
World Athletics Championships athletes for Latvia
Athletes (track and field) at the 2020 Summer Olympics